Abraham Willet (1825 – 1888) was a Dutch art collector and amateur painter.

Willet was born in Amsterdam and married Louisa Holthuysen on 17 July 1861.

Willet was a member of Arti et Amicitiae. For years, his art collection was considered the basis of the Willet-Holthuysen museum collection, but recent research has shown that his wife was perhaps more influential in forming the collection.

References

1825 births
1888 deaths
Art collectors from Amsterdam